Arkady Fiedler (28 November 1894 in Poznań – 7 March 1985 in Puszczykowo) was a Polish writer, journalist and adventurer.

Life
He studied philosophy and natural science at the Jagiellonian University in Kraków and later in Poznań and the University of Leipzig. As an officer of the reserve of the Polish Army, he took part in the Greater Poland Uprising in 1918, was one of the organizers of the Polish Military Organisation from 1918 to 1920.

He travelled to Mexico, Indochina, Brazil, Madagascar, West Africa, Canada and United States, amongst other countries. He wrote 32 books that have been translated into 23 languages and sold over 10 million copies in total. His most famous and popular book, written in 1942, was Squadron 303 about the legendary Kościuszko Squadron fighting during the Battle of Britain; it sold over 1.5 million copies. Thank You, Captain, Thank You! similarly recounts the war efforts of Polish sailors. He wrote books about his travels, documenting cultures, customs and natural wonders. From 1954 he published a historical adventure series for young people.

Family
His family includes his wife Maria, and his two sons who are all alive today. The Arkady Fiedler Museum in Puszczykowo is run by the legacy's proud family.

Selected list of Arkady Fiedler books translated into the English language
 Squadron 303 (Dywizjon 303, 1940)
 Thank You, Captain, Thank You! (Dziękuję ci, kapitanie, 1944)
 The Madagascar I Love 
 The River of Singing Fish (Ryby śpiewają w Ukajali, 1935) - about Amazonia

Jan Bober series
 Robinson Crusoe Island (Wyspa Robinsona, 1954)
 Orinoco (Orinoko, 1957)
 White Jaguar (Biały Jaguar, 1980)

Travels

 1927 - Northern Norway
 1928 - Southern Brazil
 1933 - Amazonia and eastern Peru
 1935 - Canada
 1937 - Madagascar (specifically Ambinanitelo)
 1939 - Tahiti
 1940 - France, Great Britain
 1942-1943 - USA, Trinidad, Guiana, Brasil
 1945 - Canada
 1948 - Mexico
 1952-1953 - USSR (Georgia)
 1956-1957 - Indochina (northern Vietnam, Laos, Camboja)
 1959-1960 - Africa (Guinea, Ghana)
 1961 - North-Western Canada
 1963-1964 - Brazil, Guiana
 1965-1966 - Madagascar
 1967 - Brazil
 1968 - USSR (eastern Siberia)
 1969 - Nigeria
 1970 - Peru
 1971 - West Africa
 1972 - Canada (British Columbia, Alberta, Quebec)
 1973 - South America
 1975 - Canada (Ontario, Quebec)
 1976-1977 - West Africa
 1978-1979 - Peru
 1980 - Canada
 1981 - West Africa

References

External links
 Arkady Fiedler Museum (www.fiedler.pl) 
 Coche Island

1894 births
1985 deaths
Jagiellonian University alumni
Polish travel writers
Polish male writers
Recipients of the Order of Polonia Restituta (1944–1989)
Recipients of the Order of the Builders of People's Poland
Recipients of the Order of the Banner of Work
Leipzig University alumni
Writers from Poznań
20th-century Polish journalists